William, Bill or Billy Gooderham may refer to members of the prominent Canadian Gooderham family, including
William Gooderham Sr. (1790–1881), Canadian distiller, businessman, and banker
William Gooderham Jr. (1824–1889), Canadian businessman and philanthropist, eldest son of William Sr.
Bill Gooderham (1919–1979), Canadian Olympic sailor
Billy Gooderham (born 1988), Canadian sailor in the 2011 ISAF Sailing World Championships, grandson of Bill Gooderham (1919–1979)